Christopher Elias Heiss (1660–1731) was a German painter from Memmingen, Swabia.

Born in 1660 (although many books sources claim 1670 or even 1760), he painted portraits well, he was mostly distinguished by his mezzotintos, which he executed on an uncommonly large scale, some of his plates being three feet high and two feet wide.

References

17th-century German painters
German male painters
18th-century German painters
18th-century German male artists
1660 births
1731 deaths
People from Memmingen